Sticky Beak is a children's novel first published in 1993. Written by English-born Australian writer Morris Gleitzman, it is the sequel to Blabber Mouth. The novel is set in Australia and follows the misadventures of a mute Australian girl called Rowena Batts (or Tonto for short).  Sticky Beak won the CROW award in 1994.

Plot summary

Sticky Beak picks up from where Blabber Mouth ends. Rowena's father is now married to her teacher, and at a function she throws a plate of custard and jelly into a fan, splattering it over everyone. As she tries to avoid the consequences, she rescues an abused cockatoo from the neighbourhood bully, Darryn Peck.

References

Further reading

1993 Australian novels
Australian children's novels
Novels set in Australia
Sequel novels
Novels by Morris Gleitzman
1993 children's books